Laura Ester Ramos (born 22 January 1990 in Barcelona) is a Spanish water polo goalkeeper. At the 2012 Summer Olympics, she competed for the Spain women's national water polo team in the women's event, winning the silver medal.  She also competed at the 2016 Summer Olympics.  She is 5 ft 7 inches tall.

See also
 Spain women's Olympic water polo team records and statistics
 List of Olympic medalists in water polo (women)
 List of women's Olympic water polo tournament goalkeepers
 List of world champions in women's water polo
 List of World Aquatics Championships medalists in water polo

References

External links
 

1990 births
Living people
Water polo players from Barcelona
Spanish female water polo players
Water polo goalkeepers
Water polo players at the 2012 Summer Olympics
Water polo players at the 2016 Summer Olympics
Water polo players at the 2020 Summer Olympics
Medalists at the 2012 Summer Olympics
Olympic silver medalists for Spain in water polo
World Aquatics Championships medalists in water polo
Medalists at the 2020 Summer Olympics
21st-century Spanish women
Sportswomen from Catalonia